The spot-throated woodcreeper (Certhiasomus stictolaemus) is a species of bird in the Dendrocolaptinae subfamily. It is the only species in the genus Certhiasomus (i.e. the genus is monotypic). It was formerly included in Deconychura together with the long-tailed woodcreeper, but the two are not closely related.

It is found in Brazil, Colombia, Ecuador, French Guiana, Peru, and Venezuela. Its natural habitat is subtropical or tropical moist lowland forests.

It has three subspecies: 
 Certhiasomus stictolaemus secundus of Southern Colombia, Southern Venezuela; South Amazonas, NE Ecuador, NE Peru, NW Brazil; east to Rio Negro & Rio Madeira
 Certhiasomus stictolaemus clarior of Brazil: from Rio Negro east to Amapá, French Guiana, Guyana    
 Certhiasomus stictolaemus stictolaemus of Brazil: south of Amazon from Rio Madeira east to lower Rio Tocantins & Maranhão & south to northern Mato Grosso

References

 BirdLife International 2004.  Deconychura stictolaema.   2006 IUCN Red List of Threatened Species.   Downloaded on 25 July 2007.

spot-throated woodcreeper
Birds of the Amazon Basin
spot-throated woodcreeper
spot-throated woodcreeper
Taxonomy articles created by Polbot